The Mayan Astronomers are a semi-professional ice hockey team in Mexico City, Mexico. They play in the Liga Mexicana Élite.

History
The Astronomers were founded in 2010, and began playing in the LME. They finished in first place in the regular season, but lost in the finals of the playoffs, two games to one, to the Teotihuacan Priests.

Season-by-Season Results

Honours
Liga Mexicana Élite:
Winners (1): 2017–18

References

External links
Team roster on hockeymexico.com
Ice hockey teams in Mexico